Sybra freyi is a species of beetle in the family Cerambycidae. It was described by Breuning in 1957. It is endemic to New Guinea.

References

freyi
Beetles described in 1957
Endemic fauna of New Guinea